Dunlap is a city in Harrison and Crawford counties, Iowa, United States, along the Boyer River. The population was 1,038 at the time of the 2020 census.

History
Dunlap was platted in 1867, and it was incorporated in 1871. The city was named for George L. Dunlap, a railroad official.

Dunlap's historic Independent Order of Odd Fellows Hall was added to the National Register of Historic Places in June 2011.

Geography
Dunlap is located in the northeast corner of Harrison County at  (41.853952, -95.599862). A small portion of the city extends north into Crawford County.

Many street names in Dunlap are also street names in the Brooklyn, New York neighborhood of Brooklyn Heights.

Demographics

2010 census
As of the census of 2010, there were 1,042 people, 466 households, and 279 families living in the city. The racial makeup of the city was 98.0% White, 0.7% Native American, 0.2% Asian, and 1.2% from two or more races. Hispanic or Latino of any race were 0.8% of the population.

There were 466 households, of which 23.4% had children under the age of 18 living with them, 45.7% were married couples living together, 11.6% had a female householder with no husband present, 2.6% had a male householder with no wife present, and 40.1% were non-families. 37.8% of all households were made up of individuals, and 22.1% had someone living alone who was 65 years of age or older. The average household size was 2.15 and the average family size was 2.82.

The median age in the city was 46.9 years. 21% of residents were under the age of 18; 5.9% were between the ages of 18 and 24; 21.1% were from 25 to 44; 26.6% were from 45 to 64; and 25.5% were 65 years of age or older. The gender makeup of the city was 48.0% male and 52.0% female.

2000 census
As of the census of 2000, there were 1,139 people, 483 households, and 282 families living in the city. The racial makeup of the city was 98.33% White, 0.18% African American, 0.26% Native American, 0.09% Asian, and 1.14% from two or more races. Hispanic or Latino of any race were 0.26% of the population.

There were 483 households, out of which 24.8% had children under the age of 18 living with them, 45.8% were married couples living together, 8.9% had a female householder with no husband present, and 41.6% were non-families. 37.3% of all households were made up of individuals, and 23.8% had someone living alone who was 65 years of age or older. The average household size was 2.24 and the average family size was 2.97.

22.4% are under the age of 18, 6.8% from 18 to 24, 23.6% from 25 to 44, 20.4% from 45 to 64, and 26.9% who were 65 years of age or older. The median age was 43 years. For every 100 females, there were 90.5 males. For every 100 females age 18 and over, there were 83.0 males.

The median income for a household in the city was $31,100, and the median income for a family was $39,762. Males had a median income of $26,094 versus $17,452 for females. The per capita income for the city was $17,936. About 6.8% of families and 10.5% of the population were below the poverty line, including 14.2% of those under age 18 and 9.2% of those age 65 or over.

Economy
Dunlap is home to a small number of shops, two gas stations, two bars, and a grocery store. Dunlap is also the home of a feed manufacturing plant.  There is a steak house, and two restaurants to serve customers.

Education
The Boyer Valley Community School District operates public schools serving Dunlap. It was a part of the Dunlap Community School District until July 1, 1994, when it merged into the Boyer Valley district.

Boyer Valley South High School is located in Dunlap. It is the high school for the Boyer Valley Community School system. The Dunlap public library along with the school's library joined together by a grant when the new school was built, which was finished in 2004.

Notable people
Charles W. Henney, Wisconsin politician
Nadine Jeppesen, publisher of flight maps

References

External links

 
City-Data Comprehensive statistical data and more about Dunlap

Cities in Iowa
Cities in Harrison County, Iowa
Cities in Crawford County, Iowa